Woldemar Hau (Russian: Владимир Иванович Гау; 1816 – 1895) was a Baltic German portrait painter who worked in the Biedermeier style.

Life and work 
He was the son of painter Johannes Hau, who had emigrated from Northern Germany in 1795, and he grew up in the German community of Tallinn ("Reval" in German). His half-brother was the painter Eduard Hau. In addition to his father, he studied with the former Court Painter Karl von Kügelgen.

At age sixteen, he was offered an opportunity to paint the Grand Duchesses and received a letter of recommendation to Alexander Sauerweid, a Professor at the Imperial Academy of Arts. From 1833 to 1835 he was a "guest student" at the Academy. He worked as a freelance painter for three years, then travelled extensively throughout Italy and Germany for two years. On his return, he was named Court Painter, spending the next three decades painting the Royal Family and their associates. He was appointed a member of the Academy in 1849.

Among his most famous works are his portraits of Tsar Nicholas I and the Tsarina Alexandra Fyodorovna. He eventually painted all the members of the Royal Family as well as many familiar figures in Russian and Baltic German society, such as Ferdinand Johann Wiedemann and Natalia Pushkina.
He also produced 200 miniature portraits of veterans of the Izmaylovsky Regiment. He died on 23 March 1895 in Saint Petersburg.

Selected portraits

References

External links 

 Paintings by Woldemar Hau in the Estonian Art Museum
 

1816 births
1895 deaths
People from Tallinn
People from the Governorate of Estonia
Baltic-German people
Russian painters
Russian male painters
Portrait painters
19th-century painters from the Russian Empire
19th-century male artists from the Russian Empire